James Michael Vincent (born 27 September 1989) is an English professional footballer who most recently played as a midfielder for Northern Premier League Premier Division side F.C. United of Manchester. He previously played for Stockport County, Kidderminster Harriers, Inverness Caledonian Thistle (two spells), Dundee, Hereford, and had two loan spells with Dunfermline Athletic. Vincent has over 375 professional appearances to date.

Career

Stockport County
Born in Glossop, Vincent joined Stockport County 'Centre of Excellence' aged just eight and progressed through the ranks to earn a two year Youth Team scholarship. Vincent played for the Youth Team, winning the Puma Youth Alliance trophy before making his first-team debut, in his second year Youth Team contract, as a substitute in a 1–0 win over Brentford on the last day of the 2007–08 season.

The 2008–09 season saw Vincent feature more regularly in the team. He scored his first goal for the club on 18 November 2008 in a 5–0 win over Yeovil Town in the FA Cup. He scored his first league goal, on 10 March 2009, in a 2–1 win over Hartlepool United. After the match, manager Jim Gannon said his midfield trio, of which Vincent was one, 'are really just three fantastic players'. Vincent scored his second league goal, on 24 April 2009, in a 4–1 win against Crewe Alexandra.

Vincent featured regularly in the Football League divisions (One and Two) before moving clubs and signing for Kidderminster Harriers.

In May 2011, he was informed that he would not be offered a further contract by Stockport due to the club's financial position as they struggled with administration.

Kidderminster Harriers
In June 2011, he joined Conference National outfit Kidderminster Harriers on a one-year contract under the management of Steve Burr. He made his debut in the opening game of the season, a 3–2 defeat to Gateshead, He scored his first goal for the club in a 3–1 win over Alfreton Town on 17 September 2011. Vincent then scored twice, in a 5–4 win over Braintree Town in October 2011. On 29 May 2012, he signed a new one-year contract with the club.

After a successful campaign Kidderminster missed out on promotion on the last day of the season and Vincent moved on. England legend Terry Butcher offered him a contract in the Scottish Premiership with Inverness Caledonian Thistle.

Inverness Caledonian Thistle
In June 2013, Vincent signed for Scottish Premiership side Inverness Caledonian Thistle on an initial one-year contract. He scored on his debut – in the opening game of the season – in a 3–0 win over St Mirren. After his debut, Vincent stated that he believed his move to Inverness was a "step up in my career." He signed a contract extension in February 2014, committing himself to Inverness until 2016, despite reported interest from other clubs south of the border.

Vincent featured in the Scottish League Cup final against Aberdeen but were beaten on penalties. The club went onto have the most successful period in their history finishing 3rd in the premiership and qualifying to play in Europe. 

On 30 May 2015, Vincent came on as a substitute with twenty minutes of the Scottish Cup Final remaining at Hampden Park. He scored the decisive goal in a 2–1 victory against Falkirk.

Dundee
On 22 March 2016, Dundee announced that Vincent had signed a 3 year pre contract agreement with the club along with former fellow Inverness teammate Danny Williams.

Vincent featured regularly under manager Paul Hartley but under new management changes happened within the club. Neil Mcann rebuilt the squad and the majority of the squad looked to move on. After making just five first team appearances during the 2017–18 season, Vincent moved on loan to Scottish Championship club Dunfermline Athletic on 29 January 2018. Vincent returned to East End Park for the 2018–19 season, signing a season-long loan deal on 3 July 2018. He was released by Dundee at the end of the 2018–19 season.

Inverness Caledonian Thistle 
Vincent returned to Inverness and signed a two-year contract on 20 June 2019. He made his second debut and scored against Peterhead in a 11–10 Penalty loss in the Scottish League Cup on 16 July 2019, coming on as a substitute, before making his full debut four days later in a 4–1 win over Raith Rovers. The Club went onto finish second that year but COVID put a halt to the season. The following season was played behind closed doors.

Hereford
On 1 July 2021, Vincent agreed to join National League North side Hereford.
Vincent had previously played with manager Josh Gowling at Kidderminster Harriers and worked with assistant Steve Burr, a big pull to signing at the club amidst interest from others.

After making 27 appearances in the league for Hereford, Vincent was released by the club at the end of the 2021–22 season.

FC United of Manchester 
In June 2022, Vincent joined Northern Premier League Premier Division side F.C. United of Manchester.

International career
In August 2012, Vincent was called up by the England C national team.

In September 2013, Vincent was monitored by Northern Ireland national team national team manager Michael O'Neill, over his eligibility to play for Northern Ireland however Vincent was not eligible.

Career statistics

Honours
Inverness Caledonian Thistle
Scottish Cup: 2014–15

References

External links

1989 births
People from Glossop
Footballers from Derbyshire
Living people
Association football midfielders
English footballers
Stockport County F.C. players
Kidderminster Harriers F.C. players
Inverness Caledonian Thistle F.C. players
Dundee F.C. players
Dunfermline Athletic F.C. players
Hereford F.C. players
English Football League players
National League (English football) players
Scottish Professional Football League players
England semi-pro international footballers
F.C. United of Manchester players